Skyway Manor Airport  is a public-use airport located three nautical miles (6 km) west of the central business district of Pearland and in Brazoria County, Texas, United States. The airport is privately owned by Skyway Manor.

Facilities and aircraft 
It has 1thousand [[runway designated 17/35 with a turf surface measuring 2,550 by 70 feet (777 x 21 m). For the 12-month period ending November 22, 2006, the airport had 2,400 aircraft operations, an average of 200 per month, all of which were general aviation. There are no commercial flights.

References

External links 
 

Airports in Texas
Airports in Greater Houston
Buildings and structures in Brazoria County, Texas
Transportation in Brazoria County, Texas
Pearland, Texas